The Renewable Energy Independent Power Producer Procurement Programme (REIPPPP) is an initiative by the South African government aimed at increasing electricity generation through private sector investment in solar photovoltaic and concentrated solar, onshore wind power, small hydro (<40 MW), landfill gas, biomass, and biogas. As of 2021, a total of 117 projects have been awarded to the private sector. Private sector investment totalling  has been committed to the REIPPPP, and would generate 3922 MW of renewable power. The programme supports the commitments made by South Africa under the Paris Agreement as of 2018, having contributed to climate change objectives, i.e. the reduction of 22.5 million tonnes of carbon dioxide (CO2) and saving 26.6 million kilolitres of water.

History 
At the 2011 United Nations Climate Change Conference (COP17) in Durban, the Renewable Energy Independent Power Producer Programme (REIPPP) was introduced to implement the objectives of the Integrated Resource Plan (IRP 2010-2030), of which are to diversify the country's energy mix away from fossil-fired power generation like coal and crude oil, to take advantage of opportunities relating to a Green Economy, and in creating new green industries with at least 300 000 jobs. These projects have supplied the national grid with 56 206 GWh of renewable energy. Fourteen projects have started or are currently being built. Companies are meant to submit competitive tenders and self-fund their projects to be accepted as Preferred Bidders.

Following the Stage 6 load shedding crisis in June 2022, President Ramaphosa announced that Bid Window 6 will double the amount procured from 2,600 MW to 5,200 MW, with 3,200MW allocated for wind and 1000 MW for Solar PV. The National Planning Commission also proposed the 100 MW ceiling of private generation be removed. It said solar and wind power projects can bring online 10 000 MW of capacity within 2–3 years.

Load shedding 

In 2023, in an affidavit by outgoing Eskom CEO, André De Ruyter said former Eskom CEOs Brian Molefe and Matshela Koko refused to conclude agreements with Renewable Energy Independent Power Producers, thus exacerbating load shedding. And estimated that up to 96% of load shedding would have been avoided had they not halted the REIPP programme.

Bid window allocations

See also

Renewable energy in South Africa
Solar power in South Africa

References

External links 
 Independent Power Producer Procurement Programme renewables website

Renewable energy in South Africa